Automated Alice is a fantasy novel by British author Jeff Noon, first published in 1996. The book follows Alice's travels to a future Manchester city populated by Newmonians, Civil Serpents and a vanishing cat.

The book was written as both the third book in the Vurt series and the "trequel" to the famous Lewis Carroll books, Alice's Adventures in Wonderland (1865) and Through the Looking-Glass (1871).

Plot summary
The story of Automated Alice tells of the character of Alice from Lewis Carroll's books in a future version of Manchester, England. After following her Great Aunt Ermintrude's parrot Whippoorwill through a grandfather clock, Alice and Alice's doll Celia get lost in a world inhabited by Newmonians, entities made from two objects combined, for example a zebra and a human.

Characters
 Alice

1996 British novels
1996 fantasy novels
1996 science fiction novels
Novels by Jeff Noon
Books based on Alice in Wonderland
British steampunk novels
British science fiction novels
Novels set in Manchester
Doubleday (publisher) books
Sequel novels
Vurt (novel series)